Daniel B. Borenstein, M.D., is an American psychiatrist, the 129th President of the American Psychiatric Association.

Early life

Dan Borenstein was born in Silver City, New Mexico. His parents were Isaac "Jack" and Marjorie E. Borenstein (nee Kerr), who owned and managed the Borenstein Brothers Department Store which opened in 1892, and remained in business into the 1960s.

Education and professional activities

Borenstein attended New Mexico Military Institute (1953); Massachusetts Institute of Technology, B.S. (1957); University of Colorado School of Medicine, M.D. (1962); Internal Medicine Internship, University of Kentucky (1963); Psychiatric Residency (1963–66); Chief Residency, Dept. of Psychiatry, University of Colorado Medical Center (1965–66)   
 
Licensed, Medical Board of California, 1966-current 
Certified in Psychiatry by the American Board of Psychiatry and Neurology, February 1970 
Graduate,  Los Angeles Psychoanalytic Society and Institute,  June 1971 
Clinical Professor, University of California, Los Angeles Department of Psychiatry and Bio-behavioral Sciences, 1996-current 
Physician's Alumni Association, St. John's Health Center, Santa Monica, CA  
President, American Psychiatric Association, 2001-2002

Research work
In the 1980s, prior to assuming the APA presidency, Borenstein wrote numerous academic articles addressing significant mental health issues experienced during medical training

Selected expert testimony
Testimony for plaintiff Mel Mermelstein vs. Institute for Historical Review, Holocaust denier.  
Comments About Illegal Prescription Practices & Psychiatric Holds
Arrest of colleagues for illegal prescription practices;  and regarding actress Mischa Barton's psychiatric hold status, and that of Kanye West.

References

Living people
University of Colorado alumni
American psychiatrists
Presidents of the American Psychiatric Association
David Geffen School of Medicine at UCLA faculty
People from Silver City, New Mexico
Year of birth missing (living people)